Georg Preidler (born 17 June 1990) is an Austrian cyclist, who is currently suspended from the sport after being implicated in the Operation Aderlass doping scandal.

Career
Preidler was born in Graz, Austria. As a junior, he won the national championship title, before Preidler began his professional career in 2010 at the Austrian Continental team .

Doping
In February 2019, Austrian newspaper Kronen Zeitung broke news that a number of professional cyclists had been implicated in the doping scandal uncovered at the 2019 FIS Nordic World Ski Championships. Preidler confessed to having his blood extracted for a possible transfusion. On 3 March, Preidler confessed to Austrian police, whilst also terminating his contract with  via email. Preidler was due to race during the previous weekend, later admitting to having his blood drawn on two occasions late in 2018. The team then contacted the Union Cycliste Internationale (UCI), the French Anti-Doping Agency and the Mouvement pour un cyclisme crédible (MPCC). Preidler was handed a four-year ban on 27 June 2019.

Major results
Source: 

2011
 1st  Overall Toscana-Terra di Ciclismo
 1st Gran Premio Palio del Recioto
 7th Overall Tour de l'Avenir
2012
 1st  Mountains classification, Tour du Haut Var
 1st  Mountains classification, Tour of Austria
 3rd Grand Prix of Aargau Canton
 7th Les Boucles du Sud Ardèche
 8th Giro della Provincia di Reggio Calabria
 9th Flèche d'Emeraude
2013
 1st  Mountains classification, Étoile de Bessèges
 3rd Rund um Köln
2015
 1st  Time trial, National Road Championships
2017
 1st  Time trial, National Road Championships
 1st  Mountains classification, Vuelta a Andalucía

2018
 National Road Championships
1st  Time trial
3rd Road race
 6th Overall Tour de Pologne
1st Stage 6
 7th Raiffeisen Grand Prix
 10th Overall Route d'Occitanie

Grand Tour general classification results timeline

References

External links 

1990 births
Living people
Austrian male cyclists
Sportspeople from Graz
Cyclists at the 2016 Summer Olympics
Olympic cyclists of Austria
Doping cases in cycling
Austrian sportspeople in doping cases